The 1974 Cal Poly Pomona Broncos football team represented California State Polytechnic University, Pomona as a member of the California Collegiate Athletic Association (CCAA) during the 1974 NCAA Division II football season. Led by first-year head coach Andy Vinci, Cal Poly Pomona compiled an overall record of 5–3–2 with a mark of 1–1–2 in conference play, placing third in the CCAA. The team outscored its opponents 192 to 171 for the season. The Broncos played home games at Kellogg Field in Pomona, California.

Schedule

Team players in the NFL
No Cal Poly Pomona players were selected in the 1975 NFL Draft. Quarterback Jim Zorn went on to play for a decade in the NFL, most notably as the starter for the expansion Seattle Seahawks.

References

Cal Poly Pomona
Cal Poly Pomona Broncos football seasons
Cal Poly Pomona Broncos football